Nicolas Roulet (born 24 August 1994) is a Swiss pair skater. With his skating partner, Alexandra Herbríková, he is the 2017 Bavarian Open silver medalist and a three-time Swiss national champion. They competed in the free skate at the 2016 European Championships in Bratislava.

Programs 
(with Herbríková)

Competitive highlights 
CS: Challenger Series

With Herbríková

With Heinkel

References

External links 
 

1994 births
Swiss male pair skaters
Living people
People from Neuchâtel
Sportspeople from the canton of Neuchâtel